Lestadae or Lestadai, or Leistadae or Leistadai (Ληιστάδαι), was a town of ancient Greece on the island of Naxos.

Its site is unlocated.

References

Populated places in the ancient Aegean islands
Former populated places in Greece
Ancient Naxos
Lost ancient cities and towns